Josh Bonner (born May 4, 1974) is an American politician who has served in the Georgia House of Representatives from the 72nd district since 2017.

References

1974 births
Living people
People from Fayetteville, Georgia
21st-century American politicians
Republican Party members of the Georgia House of Representatives